Baiano is a commune, population 4,743, in the Province of Avellino in the Italian region Campania, located in the Agro Nolano.

It borders the communes of Avella, Mugnano del Cardinale, Sirignano, Sperone and Visciano.

References

Cities and towns in Campania